Timothy Apiyo (died 10 June 2013) was a Tanzanian politician and civil servant.

References

2013 deaths
Year of birth missing
Tanzanian politicians
Tanzanian civil servants